Kazaziye, (also known as “Kazazlık” or “Kazaz”), is a Turkish jewelry making technique. Kazaziye is a historical technique from the Caucasus. Kazaziye is a local art from the northern Turkish city  Trabzon. Kazaziye made by hand with only 1000 carat silver or 24 carat gold. The exact history of Kazaz is not well-known, however, it is said that this art was born in Mesopotamia area by Lydians in 2800 BC and later spread north to Anatolia.

See also 
 Filigree
 Celtic knot

References

Jewellery
Turkish art
Greek art